Fortune Bay is a fairly large natural bay located in the Gulf of St. Lawrence on the south coast of Newfoundland, Canada. The Bay is bounded by Point Crewe on the Burin Peninsula and Pass Island at the entrance to Hermitage Bay to the northwest for a distance of 56 kilometers. The bay extends in a northeast direction for 105 kilometers ending at Terrenceville.

Within Fortune Bay there are also a number of inner bays and coves including, Connaigre Bay, Great Bay de l'Eau, Belle Bay and Long Harbour. There are a number of islands located in the bay, of which the largest is Brunette Island. Some of the other islands include Sagona Island, Great Island, St. John's Island, Chapel Island and Petticoat Island.

It is believed that the name Fortune Bay is derived from the Portuguese word fortuna meaning place of good fortune. It is also one of the oldest surviving names in Newfoundland when it appeared on Majollo's map from 1527.

The Geological stage Fortunian is named after Fortune bay and Fortune. The GSSP is nearby.

Settlements 
 Terrenceville
 Bay L'Argent
 Little Harbour East
 Harbour Mille
 St. Bernard's
 Jacques Fontaine
 Grand le Pierre
 English Harbour East
 Rencontre East
 Pool's Cove
 Belleoram
 English Harbour West
 Harbour Breton
 Bay d'Est
 Little Bay East

See also
List of communities in Newfoundland and Labrador

References

External links
Town of Fortune

Bays of Newfoundland and Labrador